Hamlin Township is a township in McKean County, Pennsylvania, United States.  The population was 675 at the 2020 census.

Geography
According to the United States Census Bureau, the township has a total area of 167.3 km2 (64.6 mi), of which  167.2 km2 (64.6 mi)  is land and 0.1 km2 (0.04 mi)  (0.05%) is water.

Demographics

As of the census of 2000, there were 819 people, 349 households, and 241 families residing in the township.  The population density was 4.9/km2 (12.7/mi).  There were 617 housing units at an average density of 3.7/km2 (9.6/mi).  The racial makeup of the township was 99.63% White, 0.24% Asian, and 0.12% from two or more races. Hispanic or Latino of any race were 0.24% of the population.

There were 349 households, out of which 26.9% had children under the age of 18 living with them, 56.7% were married couples living together, 8.6% had a female householder with no husband present, and 30.9% were non-families. 26.1% of all households were made up of individuals, and 9.7% had someone living alone who was 65 years of age or older.  The average household size was 2.35 and the average family size was 2.80.

In the township the population was spread out, with 80% under the age of 18, 6.7% from 18 to 24, 25.0% from 25 to 44, 31.1% from 45 to 64, and 15.1% who were 65 years of age or older.  The median age was 43 years. For every 100 females, there were 105.3 males.  For every 100 females age 18 and over, there were 100.3 males.

The median income for a household in the township was $34,219, and the median income for a family was $40,000. Males had a median income of $31,250 versus $21,328 for females. The per capita income for the township was $17,505.  About 5.8% of families and 8.0% of the population were below the poverty line, including 8.5% of those under age 18 and 9.4% of those age 65 or over.

References

Populated places established in 1844
Townships in McKean County, Pennsylvania
1844 establishments in Pennsylvania
Townships in Pennsylvania